Oona Ounasvuori (born 30 October 1998) is a Finnish figure skater. She is the 2022 Nordic champion, 2017 Open d'Andorra silver medalist, and 2021 Volvo Open Cup bronze medalist.

Career

Early years 
Ounasvuori began learning to skate in 2005. She competed in the advanced novice category beginning in the 2011–12 season through 2013–14. Her junior international debut came in February 2015 at the Bavarian Open.

Senior career 
In November 2017, Ounasvuori won silver at the Open d'Andorra.

In November 2021, she won bronze at the Volvo Open Cup. In December, she achieved the best national result of her career to date, finishing fourth at the Finnish Championships. Following Emmi Peltonen's withdrawal, Finland selected Ounasvuori to compete at the 2022 European Championships in Tallinn, Estonia.

Programs

Competitive highlights 
CS: Challenger Series

References

External links 
 

1998 births
Finnish female single skaters
Living people
People from Savonlinna
Sportspeople from South Savo
21st-century Finnish women